Connolly may refer to:

People
 Connolly (surname)

Places
 Connolly, Western Australia, a suburb in Perth, Western Australia
 Connolly, County Clare, Ireland
 Connolly Park in Collooney, County Sligo, Ireland
 Dublin Connolly railway station in Dublin, Ireland

See also
 Conley (disambiguation)
 Connelly (disambiguation)